The 1979 Asian Men's Volleyball Championship was the second staging of the Asian Men's Volleyball Championship, a quadrennial international volleyball tournament organised by the Asian Volleyball Confederation (AVC) with Bahrain Volleyball Association (BHV). The tournament was held in Manama, Bahrain from 16 to 23 December 1979.

Pools composition
The teams are seeded based on their final ranking at the 1975 Asian Men's Volleyball Championship.

Preliminary round

Pool A

|}

|}

Pool B

|}

|}

Pool C

|}

|}

Pool D

|}

|}

Final round

Classification 13th–15th

|}

|}

Classification 9th–12th

|}

|}

Classification 5th–8th

|}

|}

Championship

|}

|}

Final standing

Awards
MVP:  Wang Jiawei
Best Spiker:  Kang Man-soo
Best Blocker:  Chen Gang
Best Server:  Xu Zhen
Best Setter:  Kim Ho-chul

References
Results

V
A
Asian men's volleyball championships
Voll